Makossa is a  Cameroonian style of urban music. Like much other late 20th century music of Sub-Saharan Africa, it uses strong electric bass rhythms and prominent brass. In the 1980s makossa had a wave of mainstream success across Africa and to a lesser extent abroad.

Makossa, which means "(I) dance" in the Douala language, originated from a Douala dance called the kossa. Emmanuel Nelle Eyoum started using the refrain kossa kossa in his songs with his group "Los Calvinos". The style began to take shape in the 1950s though the first recordings were not seen until a decade later. There were artists such as Eboa Lotin, Misse Ngoh and especially Manu Dibango, who popularised makossa throughout the world with his song "Soul Makossa" in 1972. The chant from the song, mamako, mamasa, maka makossa, was later used by Michael Jackson in "Wanna Be Startin' Somethin'" in 1983. Many other performers followed suit. The 2010 World cup also brought makossa to the international stage as Shakira sampled the Golden Sounds popular song "Zamina mina (Zangalewa)".

Makassi is a lighter style of makossa.

Origins
Later in the 1960s, modern makossa developed and became the most popular genre in Cameroon.  Makossa is a type of funky dance music, best known outside Africa for Manu Dibango, whose 1972 single "Soul Makossa" was an international hit.  Outside of Africa, Dibango and makossa were only briefly popular, but the genre has produced several Pan-African superstars through the 70s, 80s and 90s.  Following Dibango, a wave of musicians electrified makossa in an attempt at making it more accessible outside of Cameroon.  Another pop singer in 1970s Cameroon was André-Marie Tala, a blind singer who had a pair of hits with "Sikati" and "Potaksima".

By the 1970s, bikutsi performers like Maurice Elanga, Les Veterans and Mbarga Soukous added brass instruments and found controversy over pornographic lyrics.  Mama Ohandja also brought bikutsi to new audiences, especially in Europe.  The following decade, however, saw Les Tetes Brulées surpass previous artists in international popularity, though their reaction at home was mixed.  Many listeners did not like their mellow, almost easy listening-styled bikutsi.  Cameroonian audiences preferred more roots-based performers like Jimmy Mvondo Mvelé and Uta Bella, both from Yaoundé.

1980s
By the 1980s, makossa had moved to Paris and formed a new pop-makossa that fused the fast tempo zouk style popularized by Kassav from the French Caribbean. Prominent musicians from this period included Moni Bilé, Douleur, Bébé Manga, Ben Decca, Petit-Pays, and Esa.

The 80s also saw rapid development of Cameroon's media which saw a flourishing of both makossa and bikutsi.  In 1980, L'Equipe Nationale de Makossa was formed, joining the biggest makossa stars of the period together, including Grace Decca, Ndedi Eyango, Ben Decca, Guy Lobe and Dina Bell.  Makossa in the 80s saw a wave of mainstream success across Africa and, to a lesser degree, abroad, as Latin influences, French Antilles zouk, and pop music changed its form.  While makossa enjoyed international renown, bikutsi was often denigrated as the music of savages and it did not appeal across ethnic lines and into urban areas.  Musicians continued to add innovations, however, and improved recording techniques; Nkondo Si Tony, for example, added keyboards and synthesizers, while Elanga Maurice added brass instruments.  Les Veterans emerged as the most famous bikutsi group in the 80s, while other prominent performers included Titans de Sangmelima, Seba Georges, Ange Ebogo Emerent, Otheo and Mekongo President, who added complex harmonies and jazz influences.

In 1984, a new wave of bikutsi artists emerged, including Sala Bekono formerly of Los Camaroes, Atebass, a bassist, and Zanzibar, a guitarist who would eventually help form Les Têtes Brulées with Jean-Marie Ahanda.  1985 saw the formation of Cameroon Radio Television, a television network that did much to help popularize Cameroonian popular music across the country.

Jean-Marie Ahanda became the most influential bikutsi performer of the late 80s, and he revolutionized the genre in 1987 after forming Les Têtes Brulées, whose success changed the Cameroonian music industry.  The band played an extremely popular form of bikutsi that allowed for greater depth and diversity.  Guitarist Zanzibar added foam rubber to the bridge of his guitar, which made the instrument sound more like a balafon than before, and was more aggressive and innovative than previous musicians.  Les Têtes Brulées emerged as a reaction against pop-makossa, which was seen as abandoning its roots in favor of mainstream success.  The band's image was part of its success, and they became known for their shaved heads and multi-colored body painting, done to represent traditional Beti scarification, as well as torn T-shirts that implied a common folkness in contrast to the well-styled pop-makossa performers of the period.  They also wore backpacks on stage, a reference to Beti women's traditional method of carrying babies while they danced bikutsi.

It took only a few weeks for Les Têtes Brulées to knock makossa off the Cameroonian charts, and the band even toured France.  While in France, Les Têtes Brulées recorded their first LP, Hot Heads, which was also the first bikutsi music recorded for the CD.  Hot Heads expanded the lyrical format of the genre to include socio-political issues.  Tours of Japan, Africa, Europe and the United States followed, as well as Claire Denis' film Man No Run, which used footage from their European tour.

1990s
In the 1990s, both makossa and bikutsi declined in popularity as a new wave of genres entered mainstream audiences.  These included Congolese-influenced new rumba and makossa-soukous, as well as more native forms like bantowbol, northern Cameroonian nganja (which had gained some popularity in the United Kingdom in the mid-80s) and an urban street music called bend-skin.

Les Têtes Brulées remained the country's most well known musical export, especially after accompanying the Cameroonian soccer team to the World Cup in 1990 in Italy and 1994 in the United States.  A new wave of bikutsi artists arose in the early 1990s, including Les Martiens (formed by Les Têtes Brulées bassist Atebass) and the sexually themed roots singer Katino Ateba ("Ascenseur: le secret de l'homme") and Douala singer Sissi Dipoko ("Bikut-si Hit") as well as a resurgence of old performers like Sala Bekono.  Bikutsi's international renown continued to grow, and the song "Proof" from Paul Simon's Rhythm of the Saints, released to mainstream promotion and success in 1990, gained yet more renown from international audiences.  Vincent Nguini also contributed guitar arrangements and performance to Simon's Rhythm of the Saints, which became an influential world music album, introducing many North American listeners to the wide range of instrumentation and genres.

In 1993, the Pedalé movement was born as a reaction to the Cameroonian economic slump.  Youthful artists like Gibraltar Drakuss, Zele le Bombardier, Eboue Chaleur, Pasto, Roger Bekono, Mbarga Soukous and Saint-Desiré Atango was a return to the aggressive, earthy sound of bikutsi roots. Meanwhile Henri Dikongué, whose music incorporated, amongst others, bikutsi and makossa, began to release albums which met international success. He went on to tour Europe and North America. The most recent form of Cameroonian popular music is a fusion of Congolese soukous and makossa, a scene which has produced Petit Pays, Marcel Bwanga, Kotto Bass, Papillon and Jean Pierre Essome.  Other popular genres include tchamassi, mangambeu and makassi.

Notes

References
 West, Ben (2004). Cameroon: The Bradt Travel Guide. Guilford, Connecticut: The Globe Pequot Press Inc.
 Noah, Jean-Maurice (2010). Le Makossa: une musique africaine moderne. Paris, France: L'Harmattan

African popular music
Cameroonian styles of music